The 2013 Judo Grand Slam Tokyo was held in Tokyo, Japan, from 29 November to 1 December 2013.

Medal summary

Men's events

Women's events

Source Results

Medal table

References

External links
 

2013 IJF World Tour
2013 Judo Grand Slam
Judo
Grand Slam, 2013
Judo
Judo
Judo